Almora is a city in India.

Almora may also refer to:

Almora district, a district in India
Almora (Lok Sabha constituency)
Almora (band), a Turkish band
Almora, Illinois, a community in the United States
 Almorah (1817), a ship
Albert Almora, American baseball player